Mulwana is a surname. Notable people with the surname include:

Barbara Mulwana (born 1965), Ugandan electrical engineer and computer scientist
James Mulwana (1936–2013), Ugandan businessman